The 1984–85 Old Dominion Monarchs men's basketball team represented Old Dominion University in the 1984–85 college basketball season. This was head coach Paul Webb's 10th and final season at Old Dominion. The Monarchs compete in the Sun Belt Conference and played their home games at the ODU Fieldhouse. They finished the season 19–12, 9–5 in Sun Belt play to finish in third place during the regular season. They reached the championship game of the 1985 Sun Belt Conference men's basketball tournament to earn an at-large bid to the NCAA tournament. As No. 12 seed in the East Region where they were beaten by 5 seed SMU in the opening round.

Roster

Schedule and results

|-
!colspan=9 style=| Regular season

|-
!colspan=10 style=| Sun Belt tournament

|-
!colspan=10 style=| NCAA tournament

NBA Draft

References

Old Dominion
Old Dominion Monarchs men's basketball seasons
Old Dominion
Old Dominion
Old Dominion